Doral may refer to:

Brands and enterprises
 Doral (cigarette)
 Doral, a trade name for ergocalciferol, vitamin D2
 Doral, a trade name for the sleep medicine quazepam
 Doral Financial Corporation, based in Puerto Rico
 Doral Hotel, Miami Beach, Florida, United States, now the Miami Beach Resort and Spa
 Trump National Doral Miami, a golf resort in Doral, Florida

People
 Doral Moore (born 1997), American basketball player
 Doral Pilling (1906–1982), Canadian javelin thrower

Schools in Doral, Florida, United States
 Doral College, a private, non-profit school
 Ronald W. Reagan/Doral Senior High School
 Doral Academy Preparatory School, a public charter middle/high school

Other uses
 Doral, Florida, United States, a suburb of Miami
 Doral Open, a golf tournament held in Doral, Florida
 Florida State Road 948, also known locally as Doral Boulevard
 Number Five (Aaron Doral), a Cylon character in the re-imagined Battlestar Galactica TV series
 Doral 't Giuk Dorali, aka The Doral, a character in Robert A. Heinlein's novel Glory Road

Masculine given names